Krivoklát (or similar spellings) can refer to

Krivoklát, a village in the Trenčín Region (Ilava District) of Slovakia
Křivoklát, a village in the Central Bohemian Region (Rakovník District) of the Czech Republic